Zimmers Hole is a Canadian heavy metal band from Vancouver. The band formed in 1991, and features former Strapping Young Lad members Byron Stroud, Jed Simon and Gene Hoglan, along with vocalist Chris Valagao.

History

Bound by Fire 
Zimmers Hole began life as a side project for members and friends of Strapping Young Lad. The band's debut album Bound by Fire was produced by Devin Townsend and released on his label Hevy Devy Records. The band was named after the sphincter of the band's late mutual friend Dean Zimmer, who would chase other people with his buttocks spread during parties. Lyrics took inspiration from comedic anecdotes from tours past, backed by middle-of-the-road "metal flying V riffs", usually stolen from Kiss and Morbid Angel. Details of the bizarre back stories for all the songs were provided by Chris Valagao ("'Gospel Sodomy Boy on Blow' is about an asshole called Troy who wouldn't stop doing coke and spouting about Jesus") and posted on the official Strapping Young Lad forums by Tracy Turner around 1999.

Legion of Flames 
In 2001, when Strapping Young Lad finished touring, Jed Simon and Byron Stroud had Townsend to produce the second album, Legion of Flames. It was released on Townsend's label Hevy Devy Records. Legion of Flames included song parodies such as "Gender of the Beast" ("Number of the Beast", Iron Maiden), "Sodomanaz" ("Go for a Soda", Kim Mitchell), and a spoof of Metallica's "Master of Puppets" in the song "Evil Robots", with the line "Napster, Napster, where's the cash that I've been after?". The album also contained a cover of Joni Mitchell's "This Flight Tonight", with humorously altered lyrics.

When You Were Shouting at the Devil... 
In August 2007, Zimmers Hole signed with Century Media Records for the release of the band's third studio album. Stroud and Simon said:

Shortly after, drummer Steve Wheeler left the band, and in December 2007 was replaced by Gene Hoglan, another former Strapping Young Lad member. Hoglan joined in time to start recording the new album. With this roster, Zimmers Hole includes three former Strapping Young Lad members, and Townsend is involved as vocal producer. The band entered Vancouver's Armoury Studios in the same month to record the album. When You Were Shouting at the Devil... We Were in League with Satan was released on March 11, 2008, through Century Media Records.

In an interview with MTV in April 2008, Valagao explained the origin of the album's name:

Hiatus and reformation
The band's activity waned after their third album, but a new live appearance was announced for 2016. In March 2016, Simon announced that Meldrum guitarist Laura Christine has joined the band. The band is currently working on their next album.

Members

Current members 
Chris Valagao (also known as "Heathen", "Dr. Heathen Hooch", "E.Val", "Lorde of Ass-Fire") – vocals (1991–present)
Jed Simon (also known as "El Smooché", "Lorde of Electric Wynde") – guitars (1991–present)
Byron Stroud (also known as "Sickie Moochmaster", "Lorde of Greased Thunder") – bass (1991–present)
Ash Pearson – drums (2018–present)

Former members 
Matt Koyanagi (also known as "Lil' Sake") – samples, keyboards (2008)
Steve Wheeler (also known as "Bangsley Starnipples", "Lorde of Strobe Lightning") – drums (1991–2007)
Will Campagna – keyboards,samples,backing vocals (2002)(2004-2007)
Chris Stanley (also known as "The High Commander of the Satanic Bubble") – guitars
Gene Hoglan (also known as "The Atomic Clock") – drums (2007–2018)
Laura Christine – guitars (2016)

Discography
Bound by Fire (1997)
Legion of Flames (2001)
When You Were Shouting at the Devil... We Were in League with Satan (2008)

References

External links
Interview with the Heathen
Encyclopaedia Metallum

Musical groups established in 1991
Musical groups from Vancouver
Canadian comedy musical groups
Canadian thrash metal musical groups
Century Media Records artists
Musical quintets
1991 establishments in British Columbia